Saruq Rural District may refer to:
 Saruq Rural District (Markazi Province)
 Saruq Rural District (Takab County), West Azerbaijan province